Viscount Mayo is a title that has been created twice in the Peerage of Ireland, both times for members of the Bourke family. The first creation came in 1627 in favour of Tiobóid na Long Bourke, also known as Theobald Bourke. He was the son of Sir Richard Bourke, 18th lord of Mac William Iochtar (Lower Mac William), and Gráinne O'Malley. Miles, the 2nd Viscount, was created a baronet in the Baronetage of Nova Scotia in c. 1638.

His son Theobald, the third Viscount, was also created a Baronet in the Baronetage of Nova Scotia in c. 1638 (although there are no records of this creation in the Great Seal). The third Viscount was executed in 1652 after being found guilty of murder by Cromwell's High Court of Justice in Connaught. The murders in 1642 became known as the "Shrule massacre", but it seems that Lord Mayo had done his best to prevent them.

The third Viscount's daughter Maud married Col. John Browne, ancestor of the Marquesses of Sligo.

On the eighth Viscount's death in 1767, the title became dormant or extinct. Historian Anne Chambers considers that a legal right continued, but that the next claimant could not afford the legal costs involved in presenting a petition to the Irish House of Lords.

The title was recreated for a very distant cousin, John Bourke, 1st Baron Naas, in 1781. He was subsequently created Earl of Mayo in 1785. See this title for more information.

Viscounts Mayo; First creation (1627)
Tiobóid na Long Bourke, 1st Viscount Mayo (died 1629) 
Miles Bourke, 2nd Viscount Mayo (died 1649)
Theobald Bourke, 3rd Viscount Mayo (died 1652)
Theobald Bourke, 4th Viscount Mayo (died 1676)
Miles Bourke, 5th Viscount Mayo (died 1681)
Theobald Bourke, 6th Viscount Mayo (1681–1741)
Theobald Bourke, 7th Viscount Mayo (died 1742)
John Bourke, 8th Viscount Mayo (died 1767)
Hon. Aylmer Bourke (1743–1748)

Viscounts Mayo; Second creation (1781)
see Earl of Mayo

References

See also
House of Burgh, an Anglo-Norman and Hiberno-Norman dynasty founded in 1193
Mac William Íochtar (Lower Mac William)

Viscountcies in the Peerage of Ireland
Extinct viscountcies in the Peerage of Ireland
House of Burgh
Noble titles created in 1627
Noble titles created in 1781